Lili Marleen is a 1981 West German drama film directed by Rainer Werner Fassbinder that stars Hanna Schygulla, Giancarlo Giannini, and Mel Ferrer. Set in the time of the Third Reich, the film recounts the love affair between a German singer who becomes the darling of the nation, based on Lale Andersen, and a Swiss conductor, based on Rolf Liebermann, who is active in saving his fellow Jews. Though the screenplay uses the autobiographical novel Der Himmel hat viele Farben (The Heavens Have Many Colors) by Lale Andersen, her last husband, Arthur Beul, said the film bears little relation to her real life.

Plot
In Switzerland, an aspiring German singer called Willie is in love with Robert, a trainee conductor who is Jewish. His family are part of a network enabling Jews and their money to find safety in neutral Switzerland. Fearing that the network could be endangered by Robert's involvement with a German woman, his wealthy father has her deported.

Back in Germany, Willie comes under the protection of Henkel, a high Nazi official who advances her career. Her song “Lili Marleen” becomes the favourite of the armed forces, making her rich and famous. Under a false identity, Robert enters Germany to try and recruit her for the network. She loves him still, and obtains for him film showing the Nazi death camps in Poland. When he is caught by the Gestapo, she comes under suspicion but is cleared. His father negotiates his return to Switzerland, where he is married to a suitable Jewish girl.

At the end of the war Willie is able to get into Switzerland, where she is delighted to attend Robert's first concert, but there is no hope of renewing their romance.

Cast
 Hanna Schygulla as Willie
 Giancarlo Giannini as Robert
 Mel Ferrer as David Mendelsson
 Karl-Heinz von Hassel as Roman Henkel
 Erik Schumann as Joachim von Strehlow
 Hark Bohm as Hugo Taschner
 Gottfried John as Aaron Nolte
 Karin Baal as Anna Lederer
 Christine Kaufmann as Miriam
 Udo Kier as Heinrich Drewitz
 Roger Fritz as Christoph Kauffmann
 Rainer Will as Edgar Bernt
 Raúl Gimenez as Emil Blonsky
 Adrian Hoven as Hellmuth Ginsberg
 Willy Harlander as Michael Prosel

Awards and nominations
Of the 23 theatrical films that Fassbinder directed, Lili Marleen was the only one that Germany submitted to the academy to be considered for a Best Foreign Language Film nomination. The film, while a German production, was one of the few that Fassbinder shot in English. Ultimately, the film was not nominated.

See also
 List of submissions to the 54th Academy Awards for Best Foreign Language Film
 List of German submissions for the Academy Award for Best Foreign Language Film

References

External links

 Fassbinder Foundation – Lili Marleen the movie

1981 films
German war drama films
West German films
1980s German-language films
Films about Nazi Germany
1980s war drama films
Films directed by Rainer Werner Fassbinder
Films about race and ethnicity
Films set in Berlin
Films produced by Horst Wendlandt
Biographical films about singers
Films based on songs
1981 drama films
1980s German films